Hymenocallis guerreroensis T.M.Howard  is a bulb-forming herb native to the Mexican states of Guerrero and Morelos. Common name "Guerrero spider-lily." It is sometimes cultivated for its showy white flowers.

References

guerreroensis
Flora of Morelos
Flora of Mexico
Flora of Guerrero
Plants described in 1978